Antiblemma concinnula is a moth of the family Noctuidae first described by Francis Walker in 1865. It is found in Guadeloupe, Saint Kitts, Dominica, Grenada, Trinidad, Suriname and Brazil. It is also found in Florida.

The wingspan is 18–20 mm.

External links

Catocalinae
Moths of North America
Moths of South America